Madison Guy (born 25 October 1994) is a soccer player and internet entrepreneur who has appeared for the Northern Ireland women's national team.

Soccer

Club and college career
Guy is from Langley, British Columbia and played youth soccer in Langley and Surrey. Between 2007 and 2010 she was on the British Columbia provincial selection and attended the Canadian national training centre. She also played for the youth team of Vancouver Whitecaps. 

In 2012 Guy graduated from Brookswood Secondary School and went to UBC Sauder School of Business on a college soccer scholarship. She captained the soccer team to the 2015 U Sports women's soccer championship, scoring in the 3–0 final win over rivals Trinity Western Spartans.

International career
Under FIFA eligibility rules, Guy could play for Ireland as her maternal grandmother is Irish. She approached the Football Association of Ireland about playing for the Republic of Ireland women's national under-19 football team, and was called into a squad training camp in January 2012. She played for the under-19s in two friendlies against Scotland in August 2012.

Guy was later capped for the Northern Ireland national team, appearing for the team during the 2019 FIFA Women's World Cup qualifying cycle. She made her senior international debut in the 3–1 win over Slovakia at Štadión pod Dubňom, Žilina on 28 November 2017. She also represented Northern Ireland at the 2018 Turkish Women's Cup.

GrantMe
Informed by her own experiences as a student athlete, in 2017 Guy founded GrantMe, an online service to help college students access additional funding. The success of the startup venture and her increased workload as the chief executive officer prompted Guy to pause her soccer career.

References

External links
 
 
 
 Madison Guy at UBC Thunderbirds

1994 births
Living people
Women's association footballers from Northern Ireland
Northern Ireland women's international footballers
Women's association football midfielders
Canadian people of Irish descent
Canadian women's soccer players
Vancouver Whitecaps FC (women) players
Republic of Ireland women's association footballers
Soccer people from British Columbia
Businesspeople from British Columbia
Canadian technology chief executives
Canadian technology company founders
People from Langley, British Columbia (city)
21st-century Canadian businesspeople
UBC Thunderbirds soccer players
Republic of Ireland women's youth international footballers